Dashtelah may refer to:
 Dashtelah-ye Olya
 Dashtelah-ye Sofla